A cryptogam (scientific name Cryptogamae) is a plant (in the wide sense of the word) or a plant-like organism that reproduces by spores, without flowers or seeds. The name Cryptogamae means "hidden reproduction", referring to the fact that no seed is produced, thus cryptogams represent the non-seed bearing plants. Other names, such as "thallophytes", "lower plants", and "spore plants" are also occasionally used. As a group, Cryptogamae are the opposite of the Phanerogamae or Spermatophyta, the seed plants. The best-known groups of cryptogams are algae, lichens, mosses, and ferns, but it also includes non-photosynthetic organisms traditionally classified as plants, such as fungi, slime molds, and bacteria. The classification is now deprecated in Linnaean taxonomy.

At one time, the cryptogams were formally recognised as a group within the plant kingdom. In his system for classification of all known plants and animals, Carl Linnaeus (1707–1778) divided the plant kingdom into 24 classes, one of which was the "Cryptogamia". This included all plants with concealed reproductive organs. He divided Cryptogamia into four orders: Algae, Musci (bryophytes), Filices (ferns), and Fungi.

Not all cryptogams are treated as part of the plant kingdom today; the fungi, in particular, are regarded as a separate kingdom, more closely related to animals than plants, while blue-green algae are now regarded as a phylum of bacteria. Therefore, in contemporary plant systematics, "Cryptogamae" is not a taxonomically coherent group, but is cladistically polyphyletic. However, all organisms known as cryptogams belong to the field traditionally studied by botanists and the names of all cryptogams are regulated by the International Code of Nomenclature for algae, fungi, and plants.

During World War II, the British Government Code and Cypher School recruited Geoffrey Tandy, a marine biologist expert in cryptogams, to Station X, Bletchley Park, allegedly when someone confused these with cryptograms.

See also
 Plant – to see how cryptogams are distributed across modern classification systems

References